Raymond Gyasi (born 5 August 1994) is a Ghanaian professional footballer who plays as a winger.

Career
Gyasi was born in the Netherlands to parents of Ghanaian descent. He was called up to join the Ghana national under-23 football team, and made his debut in a 2–0 win against the Mozambique U23s.

He joined Stabæk in 2017, his brother Edwin Gyasi already playing in the Norwegian league. After a decent 2017 season he broke his leg in late March 2018, just as the new season was about to start, and missed most of the year. He was able to return to the B team in late August 2018. Gyasi never reclaimed a place in the team, and in 2019 he only featured in three cup games and three league games. His contract expired at the end of 2019, and he was released by Stabæk. In January 2020 he joined Finnish team RoPS. In September 2020, Gyasi signed for Kazma SC.

On 16 February 2021, Gyasi signed for Noah of the Armenian Premier League. Gyasi left Noah in June 2022.

Career statistics

Club

References

External links
 
 Voetbal International profile 

1994 births
Living people
Association football wingers
Ghanaian footballers
Dutch footballers
AZ Alkmaar players
Roda JC Kerkrade players
FC Emmen players
SC Cambuur players
Eredivisie players
Eerste Divisie players
Footballers from Amsterdam
Stabæk Fotball players
Eliteserien players
Rovaniemen Palloseura players
Ghanaian expatriate footballers
Ghanaian expatriate sportspeople in Norway
Expatriate footballers in Norway
Ghanaian expatriate sportspeople in Finland
Expatriate footballers in Finland